Kazimierz Morawski may refer to:
 Kazimierz Morawski (philologist) (1852–1925), a philologist and historian, professor at Jagiellonian University
 Kazimierz Marian Morawski (1884–1944), a historian, monarchist
 Kazimierz Morawski (economist) (born 1922), an economist, activist of PZPR
 Kazimierz Morawski (journalist) (1929–2012), a journalist, leader of the Christian-Social Union